Carrao River is a river of Venezuela. It is part of the Orinoco River basin. It is well known for one of its major tributaries, the Churún River, which feeds Angel Falls, the world's highest waterfall. Another major tributary is the Ahonda River. The Carrao River flows primarily through Canaima National Park. As it starts to flow north, the Carrao River widens and meets the small town of Canaima, a vacationing destination. It flows north again, but it eventually narrows. As it continues its course west, it drains into the Caroní River, a major tributary of the Orinoco River in Venezuela.

See also
List of rivers of Venezuela

References

Rand McNally, The New International Atlas, 1993.

Rivers of Venezuela